Xylodon is a genus of crust fungi in the family Schizoporaceae.

Species
, Index Fungorum accepts 12 species of Xylodon:
Xylodon australis (Berk.) Hjortstam & Ryvarden 2007 – Australia
Xylodon bisporus  (Boidin & Gilles) Hjortstam & Ryvarden 2009
Xylodon bresinskyi (Langer) Hjortstam & Ryvarden 2009
Xylodon bugellensis  (Ces.) Hjortstam & Ryvarden 2007 – Europe
Xylodon gracilis (Hjortstam & Ryvarden) Hjortstam & Ryvarden 2009
Xylodon lutescens  (Hjortstam & Ryvarden) Hjortstam & Ryvarden 2009
Xylodon pruni  (Lasch) Hjortstam & Ryvarden 2007 – Europe
Xylodon rudis  (Hjortstam & Ryvarden) Hjortstam & Ryvarden 2009 – Colombia
Xylodon stratosus  (Hjortstam & Ryvarden) Hjortstam & Ryvarden 2007 – Africa
Xylodon submucronatus (Hjortstam & Renvall) Hjortstam & Ryvarden 2009 – Tanzania
Xylodon syringae (Langer) Hjortstam & Ryvarden 2009
Xylodon tenellus Hjortstam & Ryvarden 2007

References

External links

Hymenochaetales
Agaricomycetes genera